Fotakis is a Greek surname. It is the surname of:
 Dimitris Fotakis, Greek computer scientist.
 Georgios Fotakis (born 1981), Greece national team footballer.
 Stylianos Fotakis (died 1912), Greek lawyer and revolutionary of the 1897/98 Cretan insurrection.

Greek-language surnames
Surnames